Gary Lee Weiss (born December 27, 1955) is a former shortstop in Major League Baseball who played for the Los Angeles Dodgers from 1980-1981.

Weiss was selected by the Dodgers in the 19th round of the 1978 Major League Baseball draft from the University of Houston. He made his Major League debut on September 13, 1980 in a game against the Cincinnati Reds. In his debut season, he was used as a pinch runner in all eight games in which he appeared. Weiss appeared in 14 games in his second season in 1981, recording two hits.

, no player since Weiss has made more pinch running appearances in a season without a single plate appearance or defensive inning.

Weiss's son, Erich, was also a professional baseball player, retiring in 2019 after advancing to AAA.

References

External links

1955 births
Living people
Major League Baseball shortstops
Los Angeles Dodgers players
Baseball players from Texas
Blinn Buccaneers baseball players
Houston Cougars baseball players
Clinton Dodgers players
San Antonio Dodgers players
Albuquerque Dukes players